Wyoming Highway 350 (WYO 350) is a  east-west Wyoming state road located in southeastern Sublette County. It acts as a spur from U.S. Route 189 (US 189) in Big Piney west toward the Bridger-Teton National Forest.

Route description
Wyoming Highway 350 begins its western end near the Bridger-Teton National Forest at CR 111 five miles west of Big Piney. Highway 350 picks up the name Middle Piney Road and travels east reaching Big Piney at a little over 3.5 miles. WYO 350 enters on Piney Drive before turning south onto N. Nichols Street. And then once again turns east onto Budd Avenue before reaching its eastern terminus at U.S. Route 189 (Front Street).

Major intersections

References

External links 

Wyoming State Routes 300-399
WYO 350 - US 189 to Bridger-Teton National Forest

Transportation in Sublette County, Wyoming
350